Peritoneal washing is a procedure used to look for malignant cells, i.e. cancer, in the peritoneum.

Peritoneal washes are routinely done to stage abdominal and pelvic tumours, e.g. ovarian cancer.

See also
Peritoneal lavage

Additional images

References

External links
Peritoneal washing

Pathology